Cadosia Creek is a river in Delaware County, New York. It flows into the East Branch Delaware River east-northeast of Hancock.

References

Rivers of New York (state)
Rivers of Delaware County, New York
Tributaries of the East Branch Delaware River